Freeways
 Roads and Expressways
.                                             Cities
 or  Temporary signs such as detours and construction sites

Warning signs

Priority signs

Prohibitive or restrictive signs

Mandatory signs

Road markings/lines 
Driving lanes

Traffic regulation

Temporary signs

Route shields 

Iran
Transport in Iran